Leptomyrina sudanica is a butterfly in the family Lycaenidae. It is found in Sudan.

It is known only from Kassala State of eastern Sudan, between 1,000 and 1,300 metres elevation.

References

Endemic fauna of Sudan
Butterflies described in 1964
Hypolycaenini
Lepidoptera of Sudan